Mr. Forbush and the Penguins (also known as Cry of the Penguins) is a 1971 British comedy drama film, directed by Arne Sucksdorff, Alfred Viola and Roy Boulting. It stars John Hurt, Hayley Mills, Dudley Sutton and Tony Britton.

Plot
A brilliant biology student, Richard Forbush (John Hurt), is sent to Antarctica for six months to study a penguin colony. At first he does it mostly to impress a girl he is chasing, Tara (Hayley Mills). He stays in Shackleton's Hut with his only links to the outside world being a two-way radio to contact the navy who occasionally visit to deliver supplies and take his letters and tape recordings to Tara.

He is challenged mentally by skuas preying on the penguins' eggs and chicks and he builds a catapult to try to fight them although he is meant to observe and not interfere with nature. He is reminded of this by his failure to get rid of the skuas.

By the end of his expedition, Forbush is a changed man with a totally new outlook on life.

Cast
 John Hurt as Richard Forbush 
 Hayley Mills as Tara St. John Luke 
 Dudley Sutton as Starshot 
 Tony Britton as George Dewport 
 Thorley Walters as Mr. Forbush Sr. 
 Judy Campbell as Mrs. Forbush 
 Joss Ackland as The Leader 
 Nicholas Pennell as Julien 
 Avril Angers as Fanny 
 Cyril Luckham as Tringham 
 Sally Geeson as Jackie 
 Brian Oulton as Food-Store Clerk
 John Comer as Police Sergeant
 Hugh Moxey as Lord Cheddar

Production

Development
The film was based on a 1965 novel by Graham Billing, who had worked for the New Zealand Antarctic Division.

The film was a co-production between EMI Films, PGL Productions and British Lion Films.  It was part of the initial slate of movies greenlit by Bryan Forbes who had been appointed head of EMI.

Director Al Viola had won awards for his commercials and this would be his feature film debut. The novel was adapted by playwright Anthony Schaffer, doing his first script. Swedish filmmaker Arne Sucksdorff was hired to shoot footage in Antarctica.

Shooting
Filming started 4 November 1969 at Palmer Peninsula in Antarctica.

Making the film was a turbulent experience. Penguin footage shot by Arne Sucksdorff on location in Antarctica did not cut smoothly into scenes involving humans. Roy Boulting of British Lion replaced director Al Viola, and he replaced Susan Fleetwood, the original female lead, with his then-wife, Hayley Mills. John Hurt was angry at this and Bryan Forbes of EMI had to spend an entire evening persuading him not to quit.

Schaffer, the screenwriter, recalled it as "a fairly chaotic movie which had the young John Hurt capering about the Atlantic slinging rocks at Skuas with a Roman balista, in a vain attempt to protect penguins' eggs from their deprivations. I'm not sure that it all added up, though my younger daughter assures me... it's her favourite film of mine." He added that the female lead "was replaced after the first rough assembly and it was the only film I know of in which a stage direction was delivered as spoken dialogue. It didn't matter. No one noticed - which should generally tell you something about the respect accorded the screen writer's craft."

Sidney Gilliat then on the board of British Lion called the film "a terrible hodgepodge" and felt Bryan Forbes "made a great mistake putting Hurt in it instead of [Michael] Crawford."

Reception
The Guardian said the film "isn't as bad as we'd been led to believe." Filmink called it "a spectacularly charmless movie in which Mills is wasted, only worth watching for its location photography. Hayley is charming in her few scenes and the film would’ve been better if she’d played the lead – she would have been more at home with the material than the actual star, John Hurt." 

The film failed to recoup its considerable cost.

References

External links

Mr. Forbush and the Penguins at the Internet Movie Database
Mr Forbush and the Penguins at BFI
Review of film at New York Times
Review of film at Film Fanatic
Review of novel at Kirkus

1971 films
1970s adventure films
British adventure films
1970s English-language films
Films about penguins
Environmental films
Films directed by Roy Boulting
Films directed by Arne Sucksdorff
Films scored by John Addison
Films shot at EMI-Elstree Studios
Films with screenplays by Anthony Shaffer
Films shot in Antarctica
EMI Films films
1970s British films